Jailor is a 1938 Hindustani psychosocial melodrama film produced and directed by Sohrab Modi. Produced by Minerva Movietone, the story and lyrics were written by Kamal Amrohi and Ameer Haider with screenplay by J. K. Nanda. The film had music direction by Mir Sahib, while the cinematographer was Y. D. Sarpotdar. The film starred Sohrab Modi, Leela Chitnis, Sadiq Ali, Eruch Tarapore, Abu Bakar, Baby Kamala and Kusum Deshpande.

The film shows the transformation of a tolerant, kind-hearted jailor into a ruthless, intolerant tyrant when his wife leaves him for another man. Modi in his psychodramas tended to use a "misogynist viewpoint" regarding problems in marriage. The role, as cited by Rishi, was "chillingly portrayed" by Sohrab Modi. The film was remade with the same title in 1958 with Modi playing the same role, that of the Jailor with a different supporting cast.

Plot
Sohrab Modi is the benevolent prison warden whom everyone likes except his wife Kanwal (Leela Chitnis). The wife elopes with a doctor, Dr. Ramesh, leaving her young daughter behind. This turns the normally kind-hearted Jailor into a tyrannical man of whom everyone is scared. Circumstances make him bring his wife home when she and her lover meet with an accident and the lover turns blind. The Jailor keeps her imprisoned in a room, where she eventually kills herself due to his ill-treatment of her. The Jailor meets a blind girl and starts changing his despotic ways. On realizing that the blind girl too loves Dr. Ramesh he helps unite them dying in the end.

Cast
 Sohrab Modi as Jailor 
 Leela Chitnis as Kanwal 
 Sheela
 Sadiq Ali
 Shareefa
 Eruch Tarapore  
 Abu Bakar
 Baby Kamla 
 Kusum Deshpande

Soundtrack
The music was composed by Mir Saheb with Lyrics by Kamal Amrohi. The singers were Sheela, Leela Chitnis and Sadiq Ali.

Song List

References

External links

 Jailor (1938) on indiancine.ma

1938 films
1930s Hindi-language films
Films directed by Sohrab Modi
Indian black-and-white films
1938 drama films
Indian drama films
Melodrama films